Justice Sardar Ali Khan (5 May 1930 – 8 November 2012) was former Chief Justice of Andhra Pradesh. He held various positions in judiciary.

Early life
He was born in Hyderabad State to Mohammed Amir Ali Khan, a subedar (governor) in Last Nizam's court. He topped the Madras University's Intermediate Examination in 1948. He obtained his BA and LL.B at Osmania University.

Career
He was also Chairman of National Commission for Minorities. He was the President of the Andhra Pradesh State Legal Aid & Advisory Board. He served as President of Andhra Pradesh Judicial Academy from 1991 to 1992, He was Dean of the Faculty of Law at Osmania University from 1984 to 1991 and President of the Board of Management at Nizam College from 1994 to 1996.

Death
He died on 8 November 2012, he was 82.

Personal life
He was married and has a son and a four daughters.

References

1930 births
2012 deaths
Scholars from Hyderabad, India
Osmania University alumni
Academic staff of Osmania University
Chief Justices of the Andhra Pradesh High Court
20th-century Indian judges